Dinsmore Airport , formerly Q25, is a public airport located  east of Dinsmore, serving Humboldt County, California.. The airport is mostly used for general aviation.

Facilities 

Use 
One aircraft and one ultralight are based at the field, an average of 31 operations per week with 62% transient and 38% local general aviation operations in the year before 31 December 2011.

References

External links 

Topographic Map & Description
Airports in Humboldt County, California